Salehabad (also Romanized as Şāleḩābād and Salihābād; also known as Şāleḩābād-e ‘Olyā and Şāleḩābād-e Mālmīr) is a village in Yusefvand Rural District, in the Central District of Selseleh County, Lorestan Province, Iran. At the 2006 census, its population was 282, in 58 families.

References 

Towns and villages in Selseleh County